The Skirmish at Waters Creek was a minor action fought on March 8, 1781, during the American Revolutionary War.  It was fought near Waters Creek in Newport News, Virginia between a group of local Patriot militia and British Army troops.

Background

The state of Virginia had not been the scene of significant military activity for most of the American Revolutionary War.  This began to change with the arrival in October 1780 of 2,500 British Army troops under Brigadier General Alexander Leslie.  These troops established a fortified position at Portsmouth, and began raiding the area for supplies.  However, they were ordered to abandon the post by Lieutenant General Charles, Earl Cornwallis in November.  In January 1781 another 1,600 troops, this time under the command of the traitor Benedict Arnold, arrived in Virginia.  After making a lightning raid on the state capital, Richmond, Arnold and his men settled into winter quarters at Portsmouth.

Arnold's presence at Portsmouth was monitored by local Patriot militia, which turned out to respond to raiding and supply expeditions that he sent out.  Early on March 8, Arnold sent about 300 men on a raiding expedition to the Newport News area.  They were led by Lieutenant Colonel Thomas Dundas, leader of the regiment known as the Royal Edinburgh Volunteers, and included a company of men from John Graves Simcoe's Queen's Rangers.

When the militia were alerted to Dundas' expedition, Colonel Francis Mallory, a resident of Hampton, organized the opposition.  Mallory had recently been released from a brief imprisonment on board a Royal Navy ship as part of a prisoner exchange, and had been warned against taking up arms again.  Intelligence gained during this time led him to conclusions about the likely route of the expedition, so he tried to set up an ambush at a place called Tompkins' Bridge, crossing the creek between Hampton and York County.

Skirmish

The militiamen divided their forces with the cavalry leading the charge from the front while the infantry fired from the flank.  Colonel Mallory himself was killed in the attack, after being wounded by shot, saber and bayonet.  The militiamen were able to hold off the British forces, forcing them to retreat to Newport News point and eventually their boats.  While retreating, Captain Brown was injured and left behind.

Notes

References

 

Waters Creek
Waters Creek, Skirmish at
Waters Creek, Skirmish at
1781 in the United States
Conflicts in 1781
History of Newport News, Virginia
1781 in Virginia